Blum Affair is a 1948 German drama film directed by Erich Engel and starring Hans Christian Blech, Ernst Waldow and Karin Evans. It is based on a real 1926 case in Magdeburg in which a German Jewish industrialist is tried for murder. The film was produced in the future East Germany and produced by DEFA. It was shot at the Babelsberg Studios and Althoff Studios in the Soviet zone. The film's sets were designed by the art director Emil Hasler.

Cast
 Hans Christian Blech as Karlheinz Gabler
 Ernst Waldow as Kriminalkommissar Schwerdtfeger
 Paul Bildt as Untersuchungsrichter Konrat
 Karin Evans as Sabine Blum
 Helmuth Rudolph as Wilschinsky - Regierungspräsident
 Alfred Schieske as Kriminalkommissar Otto Bonte
 Gisela Trowe as Christina Burman
 Kurt Ehrhardt as Dr. Jakob Blum
 Gerhard Bienert as Karl Bremer
 Herbert Hübner as Landgerichtsdirektor Hecht
 Friedrich Maurer as Lawyer Dr. Gerhard Wormser
 Klaus Becker as Hans Fischer - Gutsvolontär
 Arno Paulsen as Wilhelm Platzer
 Hilde Adolphi as Alma - das 'süße' Mädchen
 Maly Delschaft as Anna Platzer
 Hugo Kalthoff as Kriminalassistent Lorenz
 Blandine Ebinger as Lucie Schmerschneider
 Reinhard Kolldehoff as Max Tischbein - Lehrer
 Emmy Burg as Therese
 Renée Stobrawa as Frieda Bremer
 Jean Brahn as Fritz Merkel
 Albert Venohr as Waffenhändler
 Gertrud Boll as Dienstmädchen bei Dr. Blum
 Otto Matthies as Reporter
 Herbert Malsbender as Redakteur
 Werner Peters as Egon Konrad
 Margarete Schön as Sophie Konrad
 Eva Bodden as Sekretärin bei Wilschninsky
 Arthur Schröder as Landtagsabgeordneter von Hinkeldey
 Richard Drosten as Zahnarzt
 Lili Schoenborn-Anspach as Patientin
 Margarete Salbach as Ruth Tischbein

Reception
Bosley Crowther, critic for The New York Times, praised it as "a trenchant dramatic exposition of the way in which an innocent German Jew is almost destroyed by nascent Nazis—back in 1926."

The film sold more than 4,330,000 tickets, making it one of DEFA's all-time most successful productions.

References

External links
 

1948 films
1948 drama films
German drama films
East German films
1940s German-language films
German black-and-white films
German courtroom films
Drama films based on actual events
Films directed by Erich Engel
Films set in the 1920s
Films about Jews and Judaism
Films about antisemitism
1940s German films
Films shot at Althoff Studios
Films shot at Babelsberg Studios